Arnold Thomas Eucken (3 July 1884 – 16 June 1950) was a German chemist and physicist. He examined the energy states of the Hydrogen atom and contributed to knowledge of the atomic structure. He also contributed to chemical engineering and process control through physical chemistry measurements for applications in industry.

Career
Eucken was born in Jena, son of the philosopher and later Nobel Prize winner Rudolf Eucken in Jena. A maternal great grandfather was the physicist Thomas  Seebeck. His brother Walter became an economist. He went to the humanist high school in Jena and studied Physics and Mathematics at the universities of Kiel, Jena and Berlin. In 1905 he began to work in Berlin under Walther Nernst on the energy states of hydrogen and received a doctorate in 1906. He examined the heat of rotation of hydrogen molecules using the vacuum calorimeter. He habilitated in 1911 and after the turbulent Turko-Italian war period he joined back in 1915 Eucken at the Technische Hochschule Breslau, and from 1930 at the University of Göttingen as a successor of Gustav Tammann. After "the seizure of power" of the National Socialists, Eucken became a member of the NSDAP in 1933. A major contribution was a "Textbook of Chemical Physics" first published in 1930.

Contributions
Eucken made important contributions within physical and technical chemistry. He concentrated on specific heat at very low temperatures, the structure of liquids and electrolytic solutions, the molecular physics (rotation, oscillation), on deuterium and heavy water, on homogeneous and heterogeneous gas kinetics, catalysis, chemical engineering and chemical technology.

Death
Eucken killed himself in Seebruck on 16 June 1950.

See also
Eucken's law
Spin isomers of hydrogen

References

1884 births
1950 deaths
Scientists from Jena
People from Saxe-Weimar-Eisenach
20th-century German chemists
20th-century German physicists
Academic staff of the University of Göttingen
Suicides in Germany
1950 suicides